The 5th Cavalry was a military unit of the British Indian Army.

The regiment was raised at Bareilly as the 7th Irregular Cavalry in 1841 as a result of the First Afghan War.

In 1861 it was renamed the 5th Regiment of Bengal Cavalry. The pre-Indian Mutiny of 1857 Bengal Light Cavalry regiments had been lost to mutiny or disbandment leaving the number free. In 1901 it was 5th Bengal Cavalry.

When Lord Kitchener became Commander-in-Chief, India he undertook to complete the unification of the armies of India, the various Presidency army regiments were renumbered into a more cohesive sequence. The Bengal regiments took the first 19 numbers with the result that the regiment was renamed simply as 5th Cavalry in 1903.

The regiment amalgamated with the 8th Lancers in 1922 to form the 3rd Cavalry.

References 
Kempton, C (1996). A Register of Titles of the Units of the H.E.I.C. & Indian Armies 1666-1947. Bristol: British Empire & Commonwealth Museum. 
Gaylor, J (1992). Sons of John Company: The Indian and Pakistan Armies 1903- 1991. Stroud: Spellmount Publishers Ltd. 

Military units and formations established in 1841
British Indian Army cavalry regiments
Honourable East India Company regiments
Indian World War I regiments
1841 establishments in British India